Chariots of the Gods is a 1970 West German documentary film directed by Harald Reinl. It is based on Erich von Däniken's book Chariots of the Gods?, a pseudoscientific book that theorizes extraterrestrials impacted early human life and evolution. The film was nominated for an Academy Award for Best Documentary Feature.

Synopsis
The film begins by introducing the cargo cults established by South Pacific Natives after coming in contact with American planes in World War II. It claims that it is likely that all religions began in a similar fashion. The viewer is then presented with various ancient texts, architecture, and artwork. Some of these include the Bible, the Pyramids, the Epic of Gilgamesh, and the Nazca Lines.

Release
The film was re-edited and dubbed into English by Sunn Classic Pictures for release in the United States in 1973.

Reception 
The U.S. release of Chariots of Gods grossed $25,948,300.
Film critic Phil Hall said "They don't make films like this any more, and we should be glad for that." The film was criticized for a lack of scientific evidence. 
Anthropologist Robert Ardrey called it science Fiction.

Soundtrack charts

References

External links
 

1970 films
1970 documentary films
German documentary films
1970s German-language films
Films directed by Harald Reinl
Films about extraterrestrial life
Films based on non-fiction books
Films shot in Egypt
Films shot in Iraq
Films shot in Peru
Ancient astronaut speculation
Pseudoscience documentary films
1970s German films